427th may refer to:
427th Aircraft Sustainment Group, inactive United States Air Force unit
427th Air Refueling Squadron, inactive United States Air Force unit
427th Bombardment Squadron, active United States Air Force unit
427th (Durham) Coast Regiment, Royal Artillery
427th (East Lancashire) Field Company, Royal Engineers
427th Maryland General Assembly, convened in a regular session on January 13, 2010
427th Reconnaissance Squadron, active United States Air Force unit
427th Special Operations Squadron (427th SOS), direct reporting unit of the Air Force Special Operations Command

See also
427 (number)
427, the year 427 (CDXXVII) of the Julian calendar
427 BC